The 1994 Cornell Big Red football team was an American football team that represented Cornell University during the 1994 NCAA Division I-AA football season. Cornell tied for fourth in the Ivy League.

In its fifth season under head coach Jim Hofher, the team compiled a 6–4 record and outscored opponents 193 to 190. Team captains were Dick Emmet, Terry Golden, Mike McKean and John Vitullo.

Cornell's 3–4 conference record placed it in a three-way tie for fourth in the Ivy League standings. The Big Red were outscored 139 to 130 by Ivy opponents.

Following a six-game winning streak, Cornell was briefly ranked No. 25 in the nation in Division I-AA, in the poll released October 26. The team then suffered a four-game losing streak and was not ranked any other week.

Cornell played its home games at Schoellkopf Field in Ithaca, New York.

Schedule

References

Cornell
Cornell Big Red football seasons
Cornell Big Red football